The Southeastern Macedonian dialects according to one of the scientific views are one of three groups of Macedonian. According to another view all or part of these dialects are part of the Bulgarian language.

The group is located in the eastern and southeastern areas of North Macedonia, surrounding the cities of Štip, Strumica, and Delčevo. The group also includes Blagoevgrad Province, or Pirin Macedonia, in Bulgaria, and Macedonia, or Aegean Macedonia, Greece. The group of Southeastern Macedonian dialects is divided into three subgroups: the eastern group, the southwestern group, and the southeastern group.

Dialects

Eastern group
Tikveš-Mariovo dialect 
Štip-Strumica dialect
Maleševo-Pirin dialect

Southwestern group
Nestram-Kostenar dialect
Korča dialect
Kostur dialect

Southeastern group
Solun-Voden dialect 
Ser-Drama-Lagadin-Nevrokop dialect

Based on the main isogloss separating the Bulgarian dialects into Eastern and Western - yat border, some of the Southeastern Macedonian dialects are classified as Eastern Bulgarian.

References

Dialects of the Macedonian language
Dialects of the Bulgarian language